Ma Wenguang (born 9 August 1956) is a Chinese weightlifter. He competed in the men's middle heavyweight event at the 1984 Summer Olympics.

References

1956 births
Living people
Chinese male weightlifters
Olympic weightlifters of China
Weightlifters at the 1984 Summer Olympics
Place of birth missing (living people)
Asian Games medalists in weightlifting
Weightlifters at the 1982 Asian Games
Asian Games gold medalists for China
Medalists at the 1982 Asian Games
20th-century Chinese people